Mycalesis orseis, the purple bushbrown, is a butterfly of the family Nymphalidae. It is found in South-east Asia.

Subspecies
Mycalesis orseis orseis (Sumatra)
Mycalesis orseis borneensis Fruhstorfer, 1906 (Borneo)
Mycalesis orseis nautilus Butler, 1867 (Assam to Peninsular Malaya)
Mycalesis orseis orsina Fruhstorfer, 1906 (Nias)
Mycalesis orseis flavotincta Staudinger, 1889 (Palawan)

References

Butterflies described in 1864
Mycalesis
Butterflies of Singapore
Butterflies of Borneo
Butterflies of Indochina
Butterflies of Indonesia
Taxa named by William Chapman Hewitson